Phidippus tyrannus is a species of jumping spider found in the United States and Mexico, first described in 2004.

References 

Salticidae
Spiders described in 2004
Spiders of the United States
Spiders of Mexico